Kwaso is a village in the Ejisu-Juaben Municipal District in the Ashanti region, Ghana. In Kwaso there is a museum dedicated to Yaa Asantewaa.

References

Populated places in the Ashanti Region